Tyrrell County is a county located in the U.S. state of North Carolina. As of the 2020 census, the population was 3,245, making it the least populous county in North Carolina. Its county seat is Columbia. The county was created in 1729 as Tyrrell Precinct and gained county status in 1739. Tyrrell County is included in the Kill Devil Hills, NC, Micropolitan Statistical Area, which is also included in the Virginia Beach-Norfolk, VA-NC Combined Statistical Area.

History
The county was formed in 1729 as Tyrrell Precinct of Albemarle County, from parts of Bertie Precinct, Chowan Precinct, Currituck Precinct, and Pasquotank Precinct.  It was named for Sir John Tyrrell, one of the Lords Proprietors of Carolina.

With the abolition of Albemarle County in 1739, all of its constituent precincts became counties.  In 1774, the western part of Tyrrell County was combined with part of Halifax County to form Martin County.  In 1799, the western third of what remained of Tyrrell County became Washington County.  In 1870, the half of Tyrrell County east of the Alligator River was combined with parts of Currituck County and Hyde County to form Dare County.

Geography

National protected area 
 Pocosin Lakes National Wildlife Refuge (part)

State and local protected areas
 Alligator River Game Land
 Alligator River Area Outstanding Resource Water (part)
 Buckridge Coastal Reserve Dedicated Nature Preserve
 Emily and Richardson Preyer Buckridge Coastal Reserve
 Emily and Richardson Preyer Buckridge Reserve (part)
 New Lake Game Land (part)
 Palmetto-Peartree Preserve
 Pettigrew State Park (part)

Major water bodies 
 Albemarle Sound
 Alligator River
 Intracoastal Waterway
 Lake Phelps
 Scuppernong River
 The Frying Pan

Adjacent counties
 Perquimans County - northwest
 Camden County - north
 Pasquotank County - north
 Currituck County - northeast
 Washington County - west
 Dare County - east
 Hyde County - south

Major highways

Demographics

2020 census

As of the 2020 United States census, there were 3,245 people, 1,594 households, and 1,035 families residing in the county.

2000 census
As of the census of 2000, there were 4,149 people, 1,537 households, and 1,055 families residing in the county. However, the North Carolina Department of Commerce 2015 County Economic Development Tier Rankings place the current population at 3,653. The population density was 11 people per square mile (4/km2).  There were 2,032 housing units at an average density of 5 per square mile (2/km2). The racial makeup of the county was 56.47% White, 39.43% African American, 0.19% Native American, 0.75% Asian, 2.05% from other races, and 1.11% from two or more races. Hispanic or Latino of any race were 3.62% of the population.

There were 1,537 households, of which 28.60% had children under the age of 18 living with them, 47.40% were married couples living together, 16.60% had a female householder with no husband present, and 31.30% were non-families. 28.20% of all households were made up of individuals, and 14.40% had someone living alone who was 65 years of age or older. The average household size was 2.42 and the average family size was 2.95.

In the county, the population was spread out, with 22.70% under the age of 18, 8.20% from 18 to 24, 30.30% from 25 to 44, 22.70% from 45 to 64, and 16.10% who were 65 years of age or older.  The median age was 39 years. For every 100 females there were 114.10 males. For every 100 females age 18 and over, there were 114.20 males.

The median income for a household in the county was $25,684, and the median income for a family was $32,468. Males had a median income of $26,227 versus $18,403 for females. The per capita income for the county was $13,326.  About 19.10% of families and 23.30% of the population were below the poverty line, including 31.50% of those under age 18 and 20.80% of those age 65 or over.

Government and politics
Tyrrell County is a member of the Albemarle Commission regional council of governments.

Tyrrell County is governed by a five-member Board of County Commissioners. The elections for County Commissioners are partisan and at large. In 2013, the County became the last county in North Carolina to adopt the County Manager form of government.

In 2022, Tyrell County is represented by Edward Goodwin Burnham in the 1st district in the North Carolina House of Representatives and Bobby Hanig in the 1st district in the North Carolina State Senate.

Economy
Tyrrell County, due to its proximity to the Outer Banks, has been designated  as part of the IBX-Inner Banks.

The North Carolina State University (NCSU) Tyrrell County Extension Center provides the county residents easy access to the resources and expertise of NCSU and NC A&T State University.

The community is serviced by the Inner Banks Hotline, a non-profit women's community shelter.

Communities

Town
 Columbia (county seat and largest town)

Unincorporated communities
 Fort Landing
 Frying Pan
 Jerry
 Pleasant View
 Kilkenny

Townships
 Alligator
 Columbia
 Gum Neck
 Scuppernong
 South Fork

See also
 List of counties in North Carolina
 National Register of Historic Places listings in Tyrrell County, North Carolina
 Roanoke Colony, first attempted permanent English settlement in the Americas, now located in Dare County

References

External links

 
 
 NCGenWeb Tyrrell County - free genealogy resources for the county

 
1739 establishments in North Carolina
Populated places established in 1739